The Norwegian International in badminton is an international open held in Norway since 1954. In the first years only the pure man disciplines were played, but since 1959 women's singles, women's doubles and mixed doubles were also played. In 1957, 1962, 1966, 1974, 1979 and 1990 the championships were halted. It is currently one of the tournaments on the European Badminton Circuit.

Past winners

Performances by nation

References

Badminton tournaments in Norway